The Baden Class IX b were German rack railway steam locomotives with the Grand Duchy of Baden State Railways, whose cogwheel drive was designed for running on track with a Riggenbach rack system.

The locomotive was produced in two sub-classes, which were designated as IX b1 and IX b2.
In 1925 they were grouped by the Deutsche Reichsbahn as DRG Class 97.2 within their renumbering plan. The engines were employed on the Höllentalbahn in the Black Forest until they were eventually and later replaced by DRG Class 85 locomotives.

See also
Grand Duchy of Baden State Railway
List of Baden locomotives and railbuses

References 

  
 

0-6-2T locomotives
09 b
Railway locomotives introduced in 1910
Esslingen locomotives
Rack and cog driven locomotives
C1′ t locomotives